The 2001 Cleveland mayoral election took place on November 6, 2001, to elect the Mayor of Cleveland, Ohio. The election was officially nonpartisan, with the top two candidates from the October 2 primary advancing to the general election, regardless of party.

Incumbent mayor Michael R. White decided not to run for re-election to a fourth term in office.

Candidates
 John E. Barnes, Jr., Ohio State Representative (Democrat)
 Dan Brady, Ohio State Senator (Democrat)
 Jane L. Campbell, Cuyahoga County Commissioner (Democrat)
 Irv Chudner
 Bill Denihan
 Tim McCormack, former Ohio State Senator (Democrat)
 Mary Rose Oakar, former U.S. Representative (Democrat)
 Raymond C. Pierce, former Department of Education Deputy Assistant Secretary for Civil Rights (Democrat)
 Ricky L. Pittman
 Kent A. Whitley

Primary election

General election

References

2000s in Cleveland
Cleveland mayoral
Cleveland
Mayoral elections in Cleveland
Non-partisan elections
November 2001 events in the United States